Manoj Bajpayee (born 23 April 1969), also credited as Manoj Bajpai, is an Indian actor who predominantly works in Hindi and has also appeared in Telugu and Tamil language films. He is the recipient of three National Film Awards, four Filmfare Awards, and two Asia Pacific Screen Awards. In 2019, he was awarded India's fourth-highest civilian honour, the Padma Shri, for his contributions to art.

Born in Belwa, a small village near the city Bettiah in West Champaran district Bihar, Bajpayee aspired to become an actor since childhood. He relocated to Delhi at the age of seventeen, and applied for the National School of Drama, only to be rejected four times. He continued to do theatre while studying in college. Bajpayee made his feature film debut with a one-minute role in Drohkaal (1994), and a minor role of a dacoit in Shekhar Kapur's Bandit Queen (1994). After a few unnoticed roles, he played the gangster Bhiku Mhatre in Ram Gopal Varma's 1998 crime drama Satya, which proved to be a breakthrough. Bajpayee received the National Film Award for Best Supporting Actor and Filmfare Critics Award for Best Actor for the film. He then acted in films such as Kaun (1999) and Shool (1999). For the latter, he won his second Filmfare Critics Award for Best Actor.

Bajpayee won the Special Jury National Award for Pinjar (2003). This was followed by a series of brief, unnoticed roles in films that failed to propel his career forward. He then played a greedy politician in the political thriller Raajneeti (2010), which was well received. In 2012, Bajpayee played Sardar Khan in Gangs of Wasseypur. His next roles were of a naxalite in Chakravyuh (2012), and a CBI officer in Special 26 (2013). In 2016, he portrayed professor Ramchandra Siras, in Hansal Mehta's biographical drama Aligarh, for which he won his third Filmfare Critics Award for Best Actor and the Best Actor Award at the Asia Pacific Screen Awards in 2016. He won the National Film Award for Best Actor at the 67th National Film Awards for his performance in the film Bhonsle.

Films

Television

Music videos

References

External links
 Manoj Bajpayee filmography at IMDb

Indian filmographies
Male actor filmographies